GMD may refer to:

 Ben Slimane Airport, in Morocco
 Gambian dalasi, the currency of Gambia by ISO 4217 code
 Game (retailer), a British video game retailer
 GDP-mannose 4,6-dehydratase, in enzymology 
 General material designation, in library cataloguing 
 General Motors Diesel, a Canadian diesel locomotive manufacturer
 Generalmusikdirektor (general music director) for an orchestra, town etc. 
 Geoscientific Model Development, a journal
  (Society for Mathematics and Information technology), now a part of the Fraunhofer Society
 The Glam Metal Detectives, a British comedy series
 Goldstein Museum of Design of the University of Minnesota
 Golm Metabolome Database, in chemical processes 
 Grimsby Docks railway station, in England
 Ground-Based Midcourse Defense, part of the United States missile defense system
 Kuomintang, spelt as Guomindang, a major political party in the Republic of China
 Maghdi language, spoken in Nigeria